The Pro Basketball League MVP is an annual award of the Pro Basketball League (PBL), the highest tier professional basketball league in Belgium, given since the 2000–01 season, to the league's most valuable player in the regular season.

Winners

References
General

Specific

MVP
Basketball most valuable player awards
European basketball awards